Brendhan Lovegrove is a New Zealand based comedian and public speaker. He performs regularly at The Classic comedy bar on the New Zealand comedy circuit, and has performed in all eight series of TV2's Pulp Comedy.  Brendhan has performed at seven galas at the New Zealand International Comedy Festival. He also played the lead role in both seasons of TVNZ's A Night at the Classic.

Career
After winning the prestigious Billy T Award in 1998, Brendhan travelled and performed at international comedy festivals throughout the world including Scotland, Canada and England. Brendhan hit the UK pro comedy circuit in 2000 and notched up some 300 comedy club shows in his first year alone. By his second year, he was performing as often as two to three gigs on key nights at clubs like Jongleurs, The Comedy Store, The Glee Club and Up the Creek.

Brendhan returned to Auckland in 2006 following a sell-out 2006 New Zealand International Comedy Festival, at which he won multiple awards. He has spent a considerable period of time on the Australian and New Zealand comedy circuit. Between 2006 and 2007 he worked alongside Kevin Black on the Solid Gold FM breakfast show. In 2010 he starred in TVNZ's A Night at the Classic, which returned for a second season in 2012.

Notable performances
Brendhan's critical acclaim in 2006 was for his show 'The Brendhan Lovegrove Project' which was performed during the 2006 New Zealand International Comedy Festival. This was followed with "The Emperor's New Show" during the 2007 New Zealand International Comedy Festival. He has been a guest at places such as the Sydney Cracker Comedy Festival in 2006, London’s Comedy Store, and featured in two episodes of UK TV’s 'Live at Jongleurs'. Lovegrove hosted the final series of TV2's 'Pulp Comedy''' and has also performed on Australia’s Rove Live, a feat unmatched in New Zealand comedy.http://www.brendhanlovegrove.co.nz/home.htm 

Awards
In 1998, Brendhan received New Zealand's highest comedy honours, the Billy T Award.

In 2006, he received the inaugural Fred Award for outstanding achievement in New Zealand comedy, the Best Show award, was named the best male comedian by the New Zealand Comedy Guild and was also honoured with the unofficial 'Most Offensive Gag Award'''.

He has received best male comedian from the New Zealand Comedy Guild in 2006, 2007, 2008, 2009, 2010, 2011, 2012, 2014 and 2015 – a total of nine times.

Brendhan received the Rielly Comedy Award from the Variety Artists Club of New Zealand in 2012.

In 2013 Brendhan won best international act at the Jakarta International Comedy Festival.

References

External links
 Sydney Flu to Scottish Hecklers | Amplifier NZ Music Brendhan Lovegrove on Amplifier.

New Zealand comedians
Living people
Year of birth missing (living people)